"An Affair to Remember (Our Love Affair)" is a 1957 romantic song which was composed by Harry Warren for the 1957 film An Affair to Remember. Lyrics were by Leo McCarey and Harold Adamson.  The song is sung by Vic Damone during the film's opening credits and then sung later by Deborah Kerr's character, Terry McKay, a nightclub singer-turned-music teacher. Kerr's singing was dubbed by Marni Nixon, who also dubbed for Kerr in the film The King and I.

"An Affair to Remember" was nominated for the Academy Award for Best Original Song in 1957 but lost out to "All the Way".

The song has since become a jazz standard.

Other recordings
Dinah Washington - included in the album  Dinah Discovered (1967).
Jane Morgan - for her album Fascination (1957).
Johnny Mathis - included in his album Love Is Everything (1965)
Julie London - for her album Our Fair Lady (1965)
Mantovani (1958)
Nat King Cole - recorded for Capitol Records, August 8, 1957.

References

1957 songs
1950s jazz standards
Nat King Cole songs
Songs written for films
Songs with music by Harry Warren
Songs with lyrics by Harold Adamson
Vic Damone songs